Riona Kiuchi (born July 26, 1994) is a Japanese recording artist and actress. She rose to the first big fame in her life when she appeared on the Japanese television show Tensai Terebi Kun MAX in 2005.

Two years earlier, Kiuchi participated in a dance contest held during the avex's annual summer concert tour a-nation 2003 and won first place in Tokyo area. Besides, she danced again at the national contest and was ranked third. Thanks to these remarkable results, she could sign a contract with avex Planning & Development Inc. to improve her general artistic skill.

Childhood and youth 
As her mother had been a singer, Kiuchi could naturally keep in touch with many kinds of music since she was a baby. Her mother asked if Kiuchi would like to get into the music industry, and she was so willing that they started training. After signing the contract, as a developing student of avex Planning & Development, she entered avex artist academy in Tokyo where thousands of young people who hope to be singers, dancers, voice actors and so on are making huge efforts upon special lessons. Since then, she had worked hard and was featured in the music video of "Choo Choo Train" by EXILE in 2003. Moreover, she finally came on the stage of Kōhaku Uta Gassen as one of many young backup dancers for the song in the end of the year.

In April 2005, Kiuchi eventually appeared on Tensai Terebi Kun MAX (TTK) and started her career as a "Terebi Senshi (TV fighter)", which is the status every child regularly featured on it has. She was the first Terebi Senshi who belonged to avex. Not more than two months later, she joined a group Tiny Circus for Music Terebi Kun (MTK) which is a very popular and traditional part of TTK featuring a lot of original music videos and has played completely original songs since the 2005 season. Despite a newcomer, she sang the first song for the group "Sakasamasakasa" as the leading vocalist. Next year, she was entrusted with solo parts in the theme song of the 2006 season, and she also recorded a duet song "Fuyu no Ageha (Swallowtail in Winter)" with Ramu Hosoda who was the second Terebi Senshi from avex. In her final season on TTK, Kiuchi finally got an opportunity to sing a completely solo song "Fuyu no Candle (Candle in Winter)", of which she collaborated with Aya Ishihara in writing the lyrics. Besides, as four years had passed since the last solo MTK song was released, it was so phenomenal that she got called the Diva of TTK and was given an award in the end of the 2007 season.

After she graduated from TTK in March 2008, Kiuchi was featured on the play "V･O･I･C･E" at Tokyo Actor & Actress Market 2008 Summer.

Discography

Albums

Singles

Notes

Living people
1994 births